Durai Murugan Kathir Anand (born 19 January 1975) is an Indian politician and Member of Parliament, elected from Tamil Nadu. He is the son of the DMK General Secretary and Minister for Water Resources in the Government of Tamil Nadu, Durai Murugan.

Elections
Kathir Anand has been elected as an MP in the 17th Lok Sabha, from the Vellore constituency. This was his first direct electoral performance.

Lok Sabha Election

References

External links
Official biographical sketch in Parliament of India website

India MPs 2019–present
Living people
Dravida Munnetra Kazhagam politicians
Lok Sabha members from Tamil Nadu
1975 births